Xupu South railway station is a railway station on the Changsha–Kunming section of the Shanghai–Kunming high-speed railway. It is located in Beidouxi Township, Xupu County, Huaihua, Hunan, People's Republic of China.

References

Railway stations in Hunan
Railway stations in Huaihua